Streptomyces plumbiresistens is a bacterium species from the genus of Streptomyces which has been isolated from with lead contaminated soil in Huixian in the Gansu Province in China.

See also 
 List of Streptomyces species

References

Further reading

External links
Type strain of Streptomyces plumbiresistens at BacDive -  the Bacterial Diversity Metadatabase

plumbiresistens
Bacteria described in 2009